St. Ann's College for Women  (informally known as St. Ann's) was established in Hyderabad, India in 1981 and is housed in 4 acres of land in Santhosh Nagar Colony, Mehdipatnam

History 
St. Ann's College was established in 1981 by the Sisters Society of St. Ann. The Founder was Smt. Thatipatri Gnanamma; a visionary who dedicated her life to enlighten and educate poor young girls.

At present the College has a strength of over 2800 students and 100 lecturers.

The College is affiliated to Osmania University and the executive committee of the National Assessment and Accreditation Council (NAAC) on the recommendation of the duly appointed Peer Team declared St. Ann's College for women Accredited at the 'A' Level on 17 October 2006.

Awards 

Right from its inception, the college has been getting University rank and distinction.
Apart from the gold medals of Osmania University, the college has instituted gold medals for the top rankers in B.A., B.Sc., and B.Com.

St. Ann's College for Women also awards silver medals for proficiency in each subject every year.

Courses of Study 
The College consists of three blocks which offers a variety of courses and options varying from Intermediate to PG in Arts, Social Sciences, Commerce and Business Management and Sciences.

See also 
Education in India
Literacy in India
List of institutions of higher education in Telangana

References

External links 
 
  http://www.naac.gov.in/
   The Society of Sisters of St. Anne

Universities and colleges in Hyderabad, India
Women's universities and colleges in Telangana
Educational institutions established in 1981
1981 establishments in Andhra Pradesh

no:St. Ann's College for Women